The World Trade Organization's Ministerial Conference of 1996 was held in Singapore on December 9 - December 13, 1996. The inaugural meeting for the organisation since its formation. The event was hosted by the government of Singapore at the Singapore International Convention and Exhibition Centre in Suntec City.

The conference established four permanent working groups, covering transparency in government procurement, trade facilitation (customs issues), trade and investment, and trade and competition. The purpose of the first of these groups was to conduct "a study on transparency in government procurement practices, taking into account national policies and, based on this study, to develop elements for inclusion in an appropriate agreement". The topics covered by these groups collectively are called the Singapore issues.

References

External links
http://www.wto.org/english/thewto_e/minist_e/min96_e/min96_e.htm

1996 in Asia
1996 conferences
World Trade Organization ministerial conferences
Economic history of Singapore
Diplomatic conferences in Singapore
20th-century diplomatic conferences
1996 in international relations
December 1996 events in Asia